Ndoucoumane or Ndoukoumane is a province in Senegal. It is an extremely rural and lightly populated area. Although Ndoucoumane holds nearly no importance for western civilization, the area is noted in Ken Bugul's book The Abandoned Baobab or in the original French, Le Baobab Fou, meaning the crazy baobab. The area is French speaking and has some influences of French colonization. Additionally, Ndoucoumane follows old traditions that stretch far back into history. There is very little safe water and population remains under 1000 with roughly 100 households.

References

Geography of Senegal